Stephen John Earle (born 1 November 1945) is an English former footballer  who played professionally in both England and the United States.

Player
An industrious midfielder, Earle played over ten years (1963–1974) for Fulham F.C. He then moved to Leicester City, playing from 1974 to 1978. During his time with Leicester City, Earle also played one game on loan with Peterborough United. In 1978, Earle moved to the Detroit Express of North American Soccer League. He played fifteen games for the Express in 1978, then moved to the Tulsa Roughnecks for eight more games at the end of the season. He remained with the Roughnecks for two more outdoor as well as one NASL indoor season. In the fall of 1980, he signed with the Wichita Wings of the Major Indoor Soccer League for one season.

Manager
In 1983, Earle became the assistant coach of the Tulsa Roughnecks. In November 1983, he took over as Roughnecks' head coach during the indoor season and had an 11–20 record and was released in March 1984. He later coached other youth and professional teams in Tulsa.

He is a member of the Oklahoma Soccer Association Hall of Fame.

References

External links
Career Details
 Along with fellow Filbert Street legends Shilton, Glover, Worthington and the late Keith Weller, Earle reminisces about his Leicester City F.C. career in the video Leicester City FC – Match of the Seventies (Vsi Enterprises Ltd ISBN BX00146328)

1945 births
Living people
Association football forwards
English footballers
English expatriate footballers
English football managers
Detroit Express players
Fulham F.C. players
Leicester City F.C. players
Major Indoor Soccer League (1978–1992) players
North American Soccer League (1968–1984) indoor players
North American Soccer League (1968–1984) coaches
North American Soccer League (1968–1984) players
Peterborough United F.C. players
Tulsa Roughnecks (1978–1984) players
Wichita Wings players
English expatriate sportspeople in the United States
Expatriate soccer players in the United States